Sotby is a village and civil parish in the East Lindsey district of Lincolnshire, England. As the population of the village remains less than 100 it is now included in the civil parish of Market Stainton.

The parish church is a Grade II* listed building dedicated to Saint Peter. It dates from the 12th century, and was restored in 1857 by Michael Drury, using greenstone, limestone and some red brick. There is a gravestone in the chancel floor to John Porter, rector, who died 1688.

References

External links

Villages in Lincolnshire
Civil parishes in Lincolnshire
East Lindsey District